Medjebar is a town and commune in Médéa Province, Algeria. According to the 1998 census it has a population of 5686.

References

Communes of Médéa Province
Algeria
Cities in Algeria